This is a list of seasons completed by the Beibarys Atyrau. This list documents the records and playoff results for all season of the Beibarys Atyrau have completed since their inception.

References

Beibarys Atyrau